The melon ladybird beetle, Chnootriba elaterii (formerly Henosepilachna elaterii) is a phytophagous ladybird species found in southern Europe, Africa and western Asia. It feeds mainly on squirting cucumber, but also on other cultivated or spontaneous Cucurbitaceae plants.

References 

Coccinellidae
Beetles of Europe
Beetles described in 1794